Antonio Olmo Menacho (born 19 August 1982 in El Cuervo) is a Spanish former cyclist.

Major results
2008
2nd Overall Cinturó de l'Empordà
8th Overall Vuelta Ciclista a León
2009
7th Vuelta Ciclista a La Rioja

References

External links

1982 births
Living people
Spanish male cyclists
People from Bajo Guadalquivir
Sportspeople from the Province of Seville
Cyclists from Andalusia